Federico Gaio was the defending champion but lost in the second round to Federico Coria.

Matteo Berrettini won the title after defeating Laslo Đere 6–3, 6–4 in the final.

Seeds

Draw

Finals

Top half

Bottom half

References
Main Draw
Qualifying Draw

San Benedetto Tennis Cup - Singles
2017 Singles